Murdaugh Murders: A Southern Scandal is a 2023 true crime television series. The series covers the Murdaugh family and the events surrounding the trial of Alex Murdaugh, beginning with the death of Mallory Beach. It was released on Netflix on February 22, 2023. The series received generally positive reviews from critics.

Episodes

Reception 

On Rotten Tomatoes, the series has an approval rating of 78% based on 9 reviews and an average rating of 6.4/10. Brian Lowry of CNN stated that the show "has a slapdash feel from beginning to end, and finds the younger contingent, especially, to be poor narrators of what transpired." Polly Conway of Common Sense Media rated the series 3 out of 5 stars, calling it "a compelling watch." Kayla Cobb of Decider described the series as "a somewhat concise guide to the murder charges around Alex Murdaugh", but noted that "there are better options out there."

References

External links 

 
 

2020s American television series
True crime television series
Netflix original documentary television series
Murdaugh family